Highway 46 (AR 46, Ark. 46, and Hwy. 46) is a state highway in South Arkansas. The route begins at AR 9 and runs east  to White Bluff Road near Redfield. The highway was created during the 1926 Arkansas highway numbering and extended throughout the 1970s. The route is maintained by the Arkansas Department of Transportation (ArDOT). A portion of the route is designated as an Arkansas Heritage Trail for its use by both armies during the Camden Expedition of the Civil War.

History
AR 46 was one of the original state highways, designated in 1926. State Road 46 ran from State Road 9 to US Highway 167 (US 167) in Sheridan (now [U.S. Route 167B).

The route was extended east to the Jefferson County line during a period of highway system expansion after Act 9 of 1973 was passed by the Arkansas General Assembly. The following year, the route was extended east to Redfield. The final extension came in 1976, adding  to the Arkansas Power and Light Company's White Bluff Steam Electric Plant as an industrial access road.

The segment of AR 46 between AR 9 and Sheridan is an Arkansas Heritage Trail, used during the Camden Expedition of the Civil War by both armies. Union General Frederick Steele used the route to approach the Confederate States of America army in Camden. Confederate Major General Thomas J. Churchill, Mosby M. Parsons, John G. Walker and Jo Shelby's units also traveled between AR 9 and Leola to the Battle of Jenkins' Ferry, and at other points during the campaign.

Major intersections
Mile markers reset at some concurrencies.

See also

References

External links

046
Transportation in Dallas County, Arkansas
Transportation in Grant County, Arkansas
Transportation in Jefferson County, Arkansas
Arkansas Heritage Trails System